Jenny Kristina Östergren Strömstedt (born Jenny Andersson; 2 August 1972) is a Swedish journalist, author and television host. She has worked on the TV4 television program Nyhetsmorgon and hosted Kalla Fakta, Pangea.nu Svart eller Vitt and Diskus. Since 8 October 2012 Strömstedt is hosting her talk show Jenny Strömstedt on TV4. On 16 July 2011, Jenny who at that time had the last name Östergren married singer Niklas Strömstedt. Jenny Strömstedt has three children from a previous relationship. She also competed in Let's Dance 2015.

References

External links 
 

1972 births
Swedish journalists
Swedish women journalists
Swedish television hosts
Swedish women television presenters
Living people
People from Sollentuna Municipality